Commencing in 1332 the numerous Holy Leagues were a new manifestation of the Crusading movement in the form of temporary alliances between interested Christian powers. Successful campaigns included the capture of Smyrna in 1344, at the Battle of Lepanto in 1571 and the recovery of the Balkans between 1684 and 1697.

According to Arnaud Blin, "the Holy Leagues retained both the spirit and the language of the Crusades" while in practical terms being quite different. The initiative for a holy league often came from a secular power, not the pope, but papal involvement was inevitable if it was to have the same spiritual benefits to participants as a crusade. Several factors encouraged the transition away from supranational crusades to state alliances, including the rise of the great powers in Europe and the unification of the Muslim enemy in the form of the Ottoman Empire.

Holy Leagues
Holy League (1332), an alliance of Christian states (including the Orthodox Byzantine Empire) raised to combat the naval threat of Turkish beyliks in the Eastern Mediterranean
 Holy League (1495) or League of Venice, an alliance of several opponents of French hegemony in Italy
Holy League (1511), a Papal-Venetian-Spanish-Imperial-English alliance against France
Holy League (1526), or League of Cognac, formed by France, the papacy, England, Venice and Milan against Emperor Charles V
 Holy League (1535), a short-lived alliance of Catholic states
 Holy League (1538), a short-lived alliance of Catholic states against the Ottoman Empire
 Holy League (1571), an alliance of major Catholic maritime states which defeated the Ottomans in the Battle of Lepanto
 Holy League (1594), a military alliance of  Christian countries against the Ottoman Empire
 Holy League (1684), composed of the Holy Roman Empire, the Polish-Lithuanian Commonwealth, Venice and Russia against the Ottoman Empire 
 Holy League (1717), an alliance of the Papal States, Portugal, Venice and Malta against the Ottoman Empire

See also
 Catholic League (disambiguation)
 War of the Holy League (disambiguation)

References

Bibliography

 
 

Crusades
14th-century military alliances
15th-century military alliances
16th-century military alliances
18th-century military alliances
Holy Leagues